Stella Kunkat (29 December 1998) is a German actress.

Biography
Kunkat attended a Montessori school in Berlin-Mitte. She sang in the children's choir of the Komische Oper Berlin where she was discovered in 2005 when she took part in the play Madame Butterfly. At the age of eight, she played her first role in the film March of Millions as the daughter of the protagonist who was played by Maria Furtwängler. In 2009, she had the role of the young Romy Schneider in the TV film Romy. Two years later, Kunkat played the young Sabine Kuegler in Jungle Child. For that role, she was nominated as Leading Young Performer in an international feature film at the 33rd Young Artist Awards. In the German production Das Tagebuch der Anne Frank, a film about the Holocaust victim Anne Frank, who wrote the famous diary, Kunkat plays Anne's older sister Margot Frank.

Filmography
 March of Millions (Die Flucht, 2007)
 Tatort –  (2008)
 Romy (2009) as young Romy Schneider
 Kinder des Sturms (2009)
 Tatort – Altlasten (2009)
 Die Zeit der Kraniche (2010)
 Jungle Child (2011) as young Sabine Kuegler
 Die letzte Fahrt (2012)
 Keine Zeit für Träume (2014)
 SOKO Wismar - Der Fall Königsberg (2015)
 Das Tagebuch der Anne Frank (2016), as Margot Frank

References

External links

German film actresses
1998 births
Living people